Cathedral Cliff is a  elevation volcanic plug located on Navajo Nation land in San Juan County of northwest New Mexico, United States. It is a prominent landmark set alongside U.S. Route 491, approximately 13 miles south of the community of Shiprock, New Mexico. Cathedral Cliff is set in the northeastern part of the Navajo Volcanic Field, a volcanic field that includes intrusions and flows of minette and other unusual igneous rocks which formed around 30 million years ago during the Oligocene. Its nearest higher neighbor is Table Mesa, one mile to the southwest, and Barber Peak is set 1.5 mile to the southeast.

Geology 
Cathedral Cliff is the eroded remnants of a maar-diatreme volcano, formed when rising magma came into contact with country rock saturated with groundwater. The resulting explosive volcanism created a deep volcanic pipe (the diatreme) and a shallow surface crater (the maar). Subsequent erosion has removed  of overlying sediments to expose the deeper diatreme, including the rarely-exposed diatreme-maar transition zone. This has been studied by geologists to gain insights into how maar-diatreme volcanism works. The pipe at this level is a mixture of intact and broken beds of pyroclastic rock deposited at a higher level, which subsequently subsided deeper into the pipe. These were partially destroyed by debris jets later in the eruption.

Climate 
According to the Köppen climate classification system, Cathedral Cliff is located in a semi-arid climate zone with cold winters and hot summers.  Precipitation runoff from this feature drains into Dead Mans Wash, which is part of the San Juan River drainage basin.

See also
 Rock formations in the United States

References

External links
 Cathedral Cliff aerial video: YouTube
 Weather forecast: National Weather Service
 Cathedral Cliff rock climbing: Mountainproject.com

Rock formations of New Mexico
Landmarks in New Mexico
Volcanic plugs of the United States
Diatremes of New Mexico
Landforms of San Juan County, New Mexico
Geography of the Navajo Nation
Oligocene volcanism
North American 1000 m summits